is a Japanese football club based in Fujieda, Shizuoka. The club has played in Japan Soccer League Division 2. They Currently plays in Tōkai Adult League, which part of Japanese Regional Leagues.

Current squad

References

External links 
Official site

Football clubs in Japan
Japan Soccer League clubs
1959 establishments in Japan
Sports teams in Shizuoka Prefecture
Association football clubs established in 1959